Tonga was the first South Pacific country to put a conservation programme in place with a series of national marine reserves. The country has four national parks which are administered by Forest Division, which falls under the Ministry of Environment and Climate Change.

National parks

'Eua National Park
The 'Eua National Park, located on the island of ʻEua, was established in 1992. It covers  area on the east coast of the island. The coordinates of 'Eua National Park are 21.4026° S, 174.9050° W.

Mount Talau National Park
The Mount Talau National Park, located on the island of Vava’u, was established in 1995. It was named after the flat-topped mountain that rises  behind the Port of Refuge. Mount Talau National Park was established to preserve the local tropical rainforest. The park is home to the Lau banded iguana (Brachylophus fasciatus), as well as the Tongan whistler (Pachycephala jacquinoti) and the Insular flying fox (Pteropus tonganus).

Kao National Park 
The Kao National Park, covers the island of Kao and surrounding marine environment.

Tofua National Park
The Tofua National Park, covers the island of Tofua and the surrounding marine environment. The island is where Captain William Bligh was stranded during the Mutiny on the Bounty incident in 1789.

References 

 
Geography of Tonga